Peter Beyer (born 9 May 1952) is a German Professor for Cell Biology at the Faculty of Biology of the University of Freiburg. He is known as co-inventor of Golden Rice, together with Ingo Potrykus from the ETH Zurich.

Biography

Peter Beyer studied Biology at the universities of Marburg and Freiburg. In 1981 he was awarded his doctorate in Cell Biology from the University of Freiburg and received his postdoctoral lecture qualification in 2000. Afterwards he was appointed Professor for Cell Biology at the Faculty of Biology. 
Since 2001 Beyer is Vice-Director Plant Biotechnology of the Centre for Applied Biosciences (ZAB) in Freiburg.

Starting 2005 Peter Beyer became Principal Investigator in the ProVitaMinRice Consortium, a program funded by the Bill & Melinda Gates Foundation and one of the selected Grand Challenges in Global Health projects. The project  «Engineering Rice for High Beta-Carotene, Vitamin E and Enhanced Iron and Zinc Bioavailability», designed to further biofortify Golden Rice with other vital micronutrients has been awarded 11.3 Million USD to achieve its goals. Research is handled by a consortium of seven laboratories in a number of countries.

Apart from Beyer's group the project involves groups from Baylor College of Medicine, Michigan State University, the International Rice Research Institute and PhilRice, both in the Philippines, the Cuu Long Delta Rice Research Institute, and the Chinese University of Hong Kong.

Research

Peter Beyer’s research focusses on the biochemistry, molecular biology and regulation of the plant [prenyl-lipid metabolism (sterols, vitamins E and K, carotenoids. Besides basic science the group focuses on applied pathway engineering to improve the nutritional value of crop plants.
Peter Beyer pioneered the metabolic engineering of plants with engineering the beta-carotene biosynthetic pathway into rice endosperm, published 2000 in Science, which is widely appreciated as one of the success stories of Synthetic Biology. Consequently, Beyer is PI in the Centre for Biological Signaling Studies, which is devoted to this novel field in science.

Publications
 The Golden Rice patent: Beyer P and Potrykus I. Method for improving the agronomic and nutritional value of plants EP1159428 B1, 5. Dezember 2001.
 Ye X, Al-Babili S, Klöti A, Zhang J, Lucca P, Beyer P, Potrykus I (2000) Engineering the provitamin A (beta-carotene) biosynthetic pathway into (carotenoid-free) rice endosperm. Science 287:303-305.
 S. Al-Babili, P. Beyer: Golden Rice - five years on the road - five years to go? In: Trends in Plant Science. 12 October 2005 S. 565-573

Awards and honors

 2002 European Science Prize 
 2006 Voted as “Most notable and influential people in agricultural, environmental or industrial biotech research of the last ten years” by the readers of Nature Biotechnology 

Beyer has been recognized as a Pioneer Member of the American Society of Plant Biologists.

References

External links
 Goldenrice.org
 Harvestplus.org

1952 births
Living people
Scientists from Hanover
20th-century German biologists
Cell biologists
Academic staff of the University of Freiburg
University of Freiburg alumni
Synthetic biologists
21st-century German biologists